Macrocin is a macrolide antibiotic.  Biosynthetically, it is produced from demethylmacrocin by demethylmacrocin O-methyltransferase and is converted to tylosin, an antibiotic used in veterinary medicine, by macrocin O-methyltransferase.

References

Macrolide antibiotics